Bradgate Brickworks is a 0.9 hectare (2.2 acre) geological site of Special Scientific Interest in South Yorkshire. The site was notified in 1988. In November 2001 a report by Rotherham Borough Council noted concern that overgrown vegetation at the site presented a risk to the geological features of the quarry face and proposed the acquisition and management of the site by the Council.

See also
List of Sites of Special Scientific Interest in South Yorkshire

References

Sites of Special Scientific Interest notified in 1988
Sites of Special Scientific Interest in South Yorkshire
Brickworks in the United Kingdom